Michael Harry Simpson (born March 13, 1947) is a former American football defensive back who played four seasons with the San Francisco 49ers of the National Football League. He was drafted by the San Diego Chargers in the thirteenth round of the 1969 NFL Draft. He played college football at the University of Houston and attended Port Neches–Groves High School in Port Neches, Texas.

References

External links
Just Sports Stats

Living people
1947 births
Players of American football from Arkansas
American football defensive backs
Houston Cougars football players
San Francisco 49ers players
People from Mena, Arkansas